The Catholic Union of Commercial Employees (KBPH) was a trade union representing white collar workers in the Netherlands.

The union was founded in 1963, when the Dutch Catholic Union of Administrative, Selling and Insurance Personnel was split up.  Like its predecessor, it affiliated to the Dutch Catholic Trade Union Federation.  By 1964, it had 9,537 members.

In 1975, the union changed its name to the Services Union NKV, and the following year, it formed a federation with the rival Mercurius.  The two unions merged completely in 1981, forming the Services Union.

Presidents
1963: Piet Kafoe

References

Catholic trade unions
Clerical trade unions
Trade unions established in 1963
Trade unions disestablished in 1981
Trade unions in the Netherlands